Puncak Regency is one of the regencies (kabupaten) in the Indonesian province of Central Papua; it is not to be confused with Puncak Jaya Regency, which is within the same province, and from whose western districts those districts now forming Puncak Papua Regency were separated in 2008. It covers an area of 7,396.47 km2, and had a population of 93,218 at the 2010 Census and 114,741 at the 2020 Census. The administrative centre is at Ilaga. The name of the regency is currently being changed to Puncak Papua Regency.

Administrative Districts
In 2010 the new Puncak Regency comprised eight districts (distrik), tabulated below with their populations at the 2010 Census. 

By 2018 the number of districts had risen to twenty-five by the splitting of existing districts. These are tabulated below with their areas and their populations at the 2020 Census. The table also includes the location of the district administrative centres and the number of administrative villages (rural desa and urban kelurahan) in each district.

References

External links
Statistics publications from Statistics Indonesia (BPS)

Regencies of Central Papua